Enersen is a surname. Notable people with the surname include: 

Adele Enersen, American illustrator
Jean Enersen (born 1944), American journalist
Ole Daniel Enersen (born 1943), Norwegian climber, photographer, journalist, and medical historian
Svein Enersen (born 1968), Norwegian newspaper editor and football player